De la Concha may refer to:

Andrés de la Concha (fl. 1575–1612), Spanish painter of the Viceroyalty of New Spain
Félix de la Concha (born 1962), Spanish and American painter
Fernando de la Concha (1789–1794), governor of Santa Fe de Nuevo México
José Gutiérrez de la Concha, 1st Marquess of Havana (1809–1895), Spanish noble
 (1760–1810), Governor of Córdoba, Argentina; see 
Mae de la Concha (born 1954), Spanish bookseller and politician
Manuel Gutiérrez de la Concha, Marquis of the Duero (1808–1874), Spanish military commander and politician
Manuel de la Concha (fl. 1815), colonel of New Spain
Manuel de Jesús Troncoso de la Concha (1878-1955), president of the Dominican Republic
Rafael Macedo de la Concha (born 1950), Mexican army general and attorney general in the cabinet of Vicente Fox
Víctor García de la Concha (born 1934), Spanish philologist

See also 
La Concha (disambiguation)
Concha (disambiguation)
José Antonio De la Cerda De Santiago Concha
Beach of La Concha, Playa de la Concha